North Carolina's 94th House district is one of 120 districts in the North Carolina House of Representatives. It has been represented by Republican Jeffrey Elmore since 2013.

Geography
Since 2019, the district has included all of Alexander County, as well as part of Wilkes County. The district overlaps with the 36th Senate district.

District officeholders

Election results

2022

2020

2018

2016

2014

2012

2010

2008

2006

2004

2002

2000

References

North Carolina House districts
Alexander County, North Carolina
Wilkes County, North Carolina